There You Are may refer to:
"There You Are" (Goo Goo Dolls song)
"There You Are" (Martina McBride song)
"There You Are" (Willie Nelson song)
"There You Are", a song by Iyaz from his 2010 album Replay

See also
 There You Are!